The Battle of Saraqeb started eleven days after the victory of the Syrian Army in the Battle of Idlib of March 2012, where they took back the main city of Idlib province. Saraqib  was considered an important strategic point because of its size, being the second largest city of the province, and its geographic position at the junction of two highways going to Aleppo: one going south towards Hama, Homs and Damascus, and one going west towards Latakia. It was also used as a base to launch attacks on military convoys.

On 24 March, the Syrian Army shelled the city briefly while leading a ground assault at the same time. A column of tanks entered the city to attack the defenses of the rebels, while infantry backed by snipers led the second wave to pursue the remaining fighters. The Free Syrian Army fighters fought back the first day and damaged a tank. In the fighting 18 of them were killed. After the first day, the rebels were forced to withdraw from the city after the army took full control of it. An opposition group accused the army of burning most of the shops in the town  and called for observers to come in the city. After the battle, security forces and Shabiha militia searched for suspected rebels and captured at least 24 and executed them.

On 28 March, the army continued their offensive and took control of Khan Sibil, a village near Saraqeb. The Arab news channel Al Jazeera showed video footage of the destruction of the city during the battle which killed dozens of armed men and civilians.

Aftermath
On 1 November 2012 rebels attacked three, and overran at least one, army checkpoints on the road to Saraqeb, killing eight soldiers and seven rebels. The rebels captured and killed two government soldiers by beating and shooting. On 2 November, Syrian Army had completely withdrawn from Saraqib. After capturing Saraqib, FSA started to bomb the Syrian Army's Taftanaz Helicopter Air Base.

References

External links 
In Cold Blood, Human Rights Watch, 10 April 2012.
They Burned My Heart, Human Rights Watch, 3 May 2012.

Military operations of the Syrian civil war in 2012
Idlib Governorate in the Syrian civil war
Military operations of the Syrian civil war involving the Syrian government
Military operations of the Syrian civil war involving the Free Syrian Army
Battles of the Syrian civil war